Luchegorsk is an urban locality (an urban-type settlement) and the administrative center of Pozharsky District of Primorsky Krai, Russia. Population:

History
It was founded in 1966 on the bank of the Kontrovod River.

Economy
There is a large electric power station which supplies the electricity to Primorsky Krai and causes ecological problems in Luchegorsk. It is the closest settlement to where the Sino-Soviet border conflict occurred.

Miscellaneous
Luchegorsk is the largest inhabited locality in the Far Eastern Federal District which does not have town status. In September 2015, The Guardian reported that 'dozens of hungry bears' had besieged the town, wandering the streets and attacking residents.

References

Urban-type settlements in Primorsky Krai
Populated places established in 1966